Built Robotics Inc. is a San Francisco, California, US-based vehicular automation startup that develops software and hardware to automate construction equipment. The company was founded in San Francisco in 2016 by Noah Ready-Campbell and Andrew Liang. The company’s primary product is the “Exosystem,” an aftermarket kit that adds autonomous robotic capabilities onto existing heavy equipment through a combination of GPS, camera, and artificial intelligence technology.

Technology 

Built organizes its technology products and services into four divisions: a heavy equipment robotic system “Exosystem”), robotic operation software (“Everest”), robotic operation tools (“Field Kit”), and a remote robot monitoring service (“Guardian”).

Exosystem 
The Exosystem began development in 2018 and was first brought to market in 2021. The technology is marketed as a means to enable autonomous excavation and earthmoving. The company’s primary advertised use for the Exosystem is for autonomous trenching. 

The Exosystem is installed on the tail of most mid-sized excavators. The company claims the Exosystem can be installed on machinery from Caterpillar, Hitachi, John Deere, Volvo, and other major manufacturers. The Exosystem consists of an all-weather enclosure that houses hardware and software. Additional sensors such as cameras, GPS, and IMUs are mounted at various points on the heavy equipment.

The Exosystem controls the heavy equipment through the electric-over-hydraulic (EH) for fully autonomous operation. It allows the existing equipment to maintain manual operation by disabling the robotic computer within the Exosystem.

As with factory robots, human robotic operators, referred to by Built as “Robotic Equipment Operators” (REOs), must still start the system’s initial operation before autonomous activities take control. REOs use a proprietary web-based platform, Everest, to supervise and control the robot. The REO can switch from autonomous to remote control mode, which allows an operator to move the robot through a remote interface.

Everest 
Everest is a proprietary software system that connects remotely with the Exosystem. The software provides an interface for human interaction with the robot and is where a trained operator can manage geo-fences, track production rates, monitor activity, remote control the robot, and start and stop autonomous activities.

Field Kit 
The Field Kit contains tools for the installation, operation, and maintenance of a robot. Operators use the components from the Field Kit to erect safety barriers, add safety signage, install hardwired and wireless emergency stops, or “kill switches,” and shoot GPS points for the geo-fence.

Guardian 
Guardian is a remote robot monitoring service. Built monitors the robot and notifies a customer of any operational anomalies. A satellite phone in the Field Kit connects customers to Guardian for support.

Safety 
Built markets an “eight-layer safety system” for robotic operation. The layers are advertised as: 
Video feeds that provide 360-degree coverage of the surrounding work area. 
Proximity radar.
110-decibel safety alarms.
High-vis LEDs to indicate the status of autonomous operation on the robot.
High-vis safety barriers that are a physical representation of the digital geofence. 
A digital geofence that confines robotic operations to a specified area on the work site.
Hardwired and wireless emergency stops, implemented as a hardwired mechanical stop on the machine and as a wirelessly activated stop located at certain points on the safety barrier  to enable remote emergency stops.

Human operators also contribute a failsafe by managing the equipment operation through the platform and using shutdown or take over to manual operations.

History

Proof of Concept 
Built Robotics began attracting attention in 2018 as one of several new companies bringing automation to the construction industry, which had been relatively slow to adopt technical innovations compared to related industries.  Commentators noted that a dearth of skilled workers available to fill construction and heavy equipment operator positions, coupled with a need for infrastructure renewal and housing, were likely driving forces behind the industry’s adoption of new technologies.

Built Robotics claims to be the first of these companies to commercially deploy fully autonomous heavy equipment in construction settings.  Founder Ready-Campbell, a former Google product manager who studied software engineering and had previously founded another startup, Twice, got his inspiration for Built Robotics from his father, who worked as a carpenter.

AI Guidance System 
The company’s first product was called the “AI Guidance System,” which began development in 2016 and was first brought to market in 2018. The technology was marketed as a solution in the excavation and grading business to enable skid-steers, CTLs, excavators, and bulldozers to function autonomously.

The company started out by expanding its market to other business areas on the functionality that the AI Guidance System can be installed on different types of existing construction equipment, including dozers and skid-steers in addition to excavators. With the development of the Exosystem, it has since narrowed its focus to autonomous trenching.

CONEXPO 
At the 2020 CONEXPO-CON/AGG Convention in Las Vegas, the company unveiled a fully autonomous excavator, bulldozer, and skid-steer loader and demonstrated its systems’ ability to remotely pilot machinery set up on a jobsite in Houston with keyboard commands. Built also announced international expansion into Australia and a labor-training partnership with the International Union of Operating Engineers (IUOE).

Company

Financing 
Built Robotics is currently a Series C startup company, having been financed through three rounds of fundraising from private venture capital funds.  The company has raised a combined total of $112 million USD through its Series A, Series B, and Series C financings. Investors who have contributed to the financings include Tiger Global, Next47, NEA, Founders Fund, Building Ventures, Presidio Ventures, Lemnos, and other investors.  Notable advisors of the company include Carl Bass, Jeff Immelt, and Justin Kan.

Patents 
Built Robotics has a number of patents issued by the US Patent and Trademark office, including “Excavating earth from a dig site using an excavation vehicle;” “Obstacle detection and manipulation by a vehicle within a dig site;” and “Checking volume in an excavation tool.”

Markets 
The technology developed by Built has been deployed on job sites in multiple US states, which do not require regulatory approval for autonomous equipment used on non-public roads.  In March 2020, the company announced that it would be expanding internationally with the onboarding of its first Australian client, MPC Kinetic.  Notable customers and business partners include Black & Veatch, MPC Kinetic, Mortenson, and Sunstate.

Labor Relations 
In March 2020, the International Union of Operating Engineers announced a formal partnership with Built Robotics through which the union will train its members to use the Built Robotics automation platform, citing a steady growth rate in jobs for heavy equipment operators coupled with an industry-wide shortage of workers.

References

Further reading

External links
 Official website

New Proposed Article for Robotics Company in San Francisco 

Unmanned ground vehicles
Technology companies based in the San Francisco Bay Area
2016 establishments in California
American companies established in 2016
Technology companies established in 2016